John 20:6 is the sixth verse of the twentieth chapter of the Gospel of John in the Bible.  Peter and the Beloved Disciple have just arrived at the empty tomb of Jesus. The Beloved Disciple, who arrived slightly ahead of Peter, paused outside the empty tomb.  In the verse, Peter enters the tomb upon his arrival.

Content
In the King James Version of the Bible, the text reads:
Then cometh Simon Peter following 
him, and went into the sepulchre, 
and seeth the linen clothes lie,

The English Standard Version translates the passage as:
Then Simon Peter came, following
him, and went into the tomb.
He saw the linen cloths lying there,

For a collection of other versions see BibleHub John 20:6

Analysis
Though Peter arrived second, he enters the tomb first. To F.F. Bruce, Peter entering the tomb as soon as he arrives shows his "characteristic impetuosity". That Peter enters the tomb without trepidation or hesitation is seen by other scholars as an indication that he was not greatly affected by guilt due to the events surrounding the crucifixion.  Barrett states that the passage is an attempt to subordinate the Beloved Disciple to Peter and make up for the disciple beating Peter in the race for the tomb.

The word translated as seeth/saw is closer to examine, implying that Peter is paying detailed attention to the strips of linen. This contrasts with the previous verse, where the Greek implies the Beloved Disciple gave a much shorter glance to the linens.

The strips of linen presumably refer to the grave clothes of Jesus that are discussed in greater detail in John 20:7.  Some translators believe "lying there" is best interpreted as "lying on the ground". Brown disagrees and reads this turn of phrase as evidence that the grave clothes were sitting upon a shelf in the tomb. It is notable that John refers to the grave clothes as "strips". In Luke and traditionally, Jesus was wrapped in a shroud.

See also
Shroud of Turin
Sudarium of Oviedo

References

External links
Jesus Appears to His Disciples

20:06
John 20:06